Divine Justice is a crime novel written by American author David Baldacci. This is the fourth installment to feature the Camel Club. The book was initially published on November 4, 2008 by Grand Central Publishing.

References

External links
Official website

2008 American novels
Novels by David Baldacci